Moses Lake is a lake and reservoir along the course of Crab Creek, in the U.S. state of Washington.

Moses Lake is part of the Columbia River basin, as Crab Creek is a tributary of the Columbia River.

Although originally a shallow natural lake, Moses Lake was dammed in the early 20th century for irrigation purposes. It then became part of the Columbia Basin Project, built and managed by the United States Bureau of Reclamation. Moses Lake receives water from Crab Creek, as well as from irrigated agricultural runoff. Its water used to flow out into Crab Creek, but now flows into Potholes Reservoir, a storage reservoir created by impounding Crab Creek at O'Sullivan Dam.

Moses Lake is fairly complex in shape, with several arms, called "horns". These horns include Lewis Horn, Parker Horn, and Pelican Horn. There are several islands in Moses Lake, including Crest Island, Marsh Island, Gaileys Island, and Goat Island.

Moses Lake was named after Chief Moses in the late 19th century. The city of Moses Lake was, in turn, named after the lake.

The city of Moses Lake was first named Neppel, and not Moses Lake until 1938.

References

Lakes of Washington (state)
Reservoirs in Washington (state)
Lakes of Grant County, Washington
Protected areas of Grant County, Washington
Moses Lake, Washington